Jasenovac is a settlement in the region of Baranja, Croatia. Administratively, it is located in the Kneževi Vinogradi municipality within the Osijek-Baranja County. In the 2011 Croatian census it had a population of 35.

References

Kneževi Vinogradi